Geri D. Huser (born July 14, 1963) is a Democratic party politician. She served in the Iowa House of Representatives from 1996 to 2011.

Education
Huser graduated from Southeast Polk High School and later received a BA in social work from Briar Cliff College. She also got a law degree from Drake University.

Career
She served as a Planning Specialist with Polk County Social Services and has been director of Iowa Finance Authority's Title Guaranty Division. From 1990 to 1994, she served as a member of the Altoona City Council. She also served on the Metropolitan Planning Organization beginning in 1990.

From 1996 to 2011, Huser represented the 42nd District in the Iowa House of Representatives and served on several committees: the Judiciary committee; the Local Government committee; the Ways and Means committee; and the Transportation committee, which she chaired.  In 2006, Huser was re-elected with 8,493 votes, running unopposed. She lost re-election in 2011 to Republican Kim Pearson by 126 votes.

After serving in the House, Huser became a partner at Skinner Law Firm.

As Chairwoman of the Iowa Utilities Board, she voted in June 2016 not to allow the controversial construction of the Bakken pipeline to continue, but lost due to votes by the other two members, Nick Wagner and Libby Jacobs, who voted in favor. Huser was named to Governor Terry Branstad's Transportation 2020 Citizen Advisory Commission.

Family
Huser is the daughter of Ed and Lois Skinner. She is married to her husband Dan, and together they have a daughter, Kelli, and a son, Blake.

Organizations
Altoona City Council (2 years)
Greater Des Moines Housing Trust Fund Board
Metropolitan Planning Organization
Altoona Family Home
East Polk Interagency Association

References

External links
 Representative Geri Huser official Iowa General Assembly site
Representative Geri Huser official constituency blog
 

Democratic Party members of the Iowa House of Representatives
Living people
Women state legislators in Iowa
1963 births
Iowa city council members
Politicians from Des Moines, Iowa
People from Altoona, Iowa
Women city councillors in Iowa
21st-century American women